Bharatshet Gogawale is a Shiv Sena politician from Raigad district, Maharashtra. He is current Member of Legislative Assembly from Mahad Vidhan Sabha constituency of Konkan, Maharashtra, India as a member of Shiv Sena. He has been elected for three consecutive terms in the Maharashtra Legislative Assembly for 2009,2014 and 2019 with 1.2lakh votes .

Positions held
 2009: Elected to Maharashtra Legislative Assembly
 2014: Re-elected to Maharashtra Legislative Assembly
 2019: Re-elected to Maharashtra Legislative Assembly

See also
 Raigad Lok Sabha constituency

References

External links
 Shivsena Home Page

Living people
People from Ratnagiri district
Maharashtra MLAs 2009–2014
Maharashtra MLAs 2014–2019
Year of birth missing (living people)
Place of birth missing (living people)
Marathi politicians